The following is a list of all novae that are known to have occurred in 2019. A nova is an energetic astronomical event caused by a white dwarf accreting matter from a star it is orbiting (typically a red giant, whose outer layers are more weakly attached than smaller, denser stars) Alternatively, novae can be caused by a pair of stars merging with each other, however such events are vastly less common than novae caused by white dwarfs.

In 2019, at least sixteen Milky Way novae were discovered, eight of which were dwarf nova eruptions, one of the variable system V386 Serpentis, one from the known nova-like system 2E 1516.6-6827, and four from previously unidentified white dwarf binaries. One of these binaries, TCP J18200437-1033071, may have possibly been involved in another outburst in 1951.  The recurrent nova V3890 Sgr, which had been seen to erupt in 1962 and 1990, also erupted again in 2019.

List of novae in 2019

In the Milky Way

In the Andromeda Galaxy
Novae are also frequently spotted in the Andromeda Galaxy, and are even slightly more commonly found than in the Milky Way, as there is less intervening dust to prevent their detection. Furthermore, Andromeda is circumpolar for observers north of latitude +48-50, roughly the latitude of the Canadian-American border, allowing observers north of that to search for transients all year.

In 2019, 11 novae have been seen in the Andromeda galaxy.

In other galaxies
Any galaxy within 20 million light-years of the Sun could theoretically have nova events bright enough to be detected from Earth, although in practice most are only detected in galaxies within 10-15 million light-years of the Milky Way, such as the Triangulum Galaxy, Messier 81, Messier 82, Messier 83, and Messier 94.

In 2019, two novae were observed in Messier 81, and another in the Triangulum Galaxy. A luminous red nova was observed in the Whirlpool Galaxy (Messier 51a), probably caused by a merger of two stars.

See also
List of novae in 2018
Nova
Dwarf nova
Luminous red nova
Guest star (astronomy)
Supernova

Notes

References

External links
List of all galactic novae

2019 in space
Novae
Novae in 2019
Novae